The Hildesheim Invaders are an American football team founded in 1983 from Hildesheim, Germany.

The club's greatest success has been promotion to the American football Bundesliga, now the German Football League the highest level league, in 1989 where it played for two seasons until 1991. A division title in the German Football League 2 in 2015 earned the club the right to return to the highest level of play in Germany, should it meet the licensing requirements, which they did. 

The team currently as of 2022 plays again in the GFL2.

History
Formed in 1983 the Invaders entered the northern division of tier two 2. Bundesliga from 1986. The club won division championships at this level in 1986 and 1989 with the latter earning it promotion to the American football Bundesliga. Hildesheim played for two seasons at this level, coming fourth in its division in 1990 but finishing last the year after, losing all ten season games. From 1992 to 1994 and, again, from 1996 to 2000 the team played in the 2. Bundesliga again, dropping down to the Regionalliga for a season in 1995.

The end of the 2000 season saw the club relegated and stepping down to the tier four Oberliga for a season. Between 2001 and 2006 the Invaders fluctuated between the third and fourth tier of the league system. From 2006 onwards the fortunes of the club improved again, earning promotion to the Regionalliga that year, followed by promotion back to the 2. Bundesliga in 2008. From 2008 to 2014 the club fluctuated between the Regionalliga and the 2. Bundesliga, with the latter now renamed to German Football League 2. Promotion from the Regionalliga in 2008, 2011 and 2013 was followed by relegation from the second tier in 2009 and 2012. The Invaders were able to establish themselves in the GFL 2 in 2014 and won the northern division in 2015, thereby earning the right to compete in the German Football League in 2016, taking up a spot made vacant by the withdrawal of the Cologne Falcons before the start of the 2015 season. The mother club of the team, Eintracht Hildesheim, decided in October 2015 to apply for a GFL licence, which was successful

Honours
 GFL
 Play-off qualification: (1) 2019
 League membership: (6) 1990–1991, 2016–2019
 GFL 2
 Northern Division champions: (3) 1986, 1989, 2015

Recent seasons
Recent seasons of the club:

 PR = Promotion round
 QF = Quarter finals

References

External links
 Official website  
 German Football League official website  
 Football History  Historic American football tables from Germany

American football teams in Germany
German Football League teams
American football teams established in 1983
1983 establishments in West Germany
Invaders